In mathematics, a sum-free sequence is an increasing sequence of positive integers,

 

such that no term  can be represented as a sum of any subset of the preceding elements of the sequence. 

This differs from a sum-free set, where only pairs of sums must be avoided, but where those sums may come from the whole set rather than just the preceding terms.

Example
The powers of two,
1, 2, 4, 8, 16, ...
form a sum-free sequence: each term in the sequence is one more than the sum of all preceding terms, and so cannot be represented as a sum of preceding terms.

Sums of reciprocals
A set of integers is said to be small if the sum of its reciprocals converges to a finite value. For instance, by the prime number theorem, the prime numbers are not small.  proved that every sum-free sequence is small, and asked how large the sum of reciprocals could be. For instance, the sum of the reciprocals of the powers of two (a geometric series) is two.

If  denotes the maximum sum of reciprocals of a sum-free sequence, then through subsequent research it is known that .

Density

Notes

References
.
.
. 
.
.
.
.
.

Additive combinatorics
Integer sequences